The 2015 Gomelsky Cup  is the 8th edition of the tournament. It will be played in the Universal Sports Hall in Moscow on October 3 and 4.

Participant teams

Tournament

Semifinals

Third place

Final

References and notes 

2015
2015–16 in Russian basketball
2015–16 in Spanish basketball
2015–16 in Greek basketball